Min, Marquis of Jin was the last ruler of the state of Jin from the original branch of the ruling House of Ji.  His ancestral name was Ji (姬), given name Min (緡). When Duke Wu of Quwo killed Marquis Xiaozi of Jin, King Huan of Zhou installed Min on the throne as Marquis of Jin. He reigned for 27 years.

In 678 BC, Duke Wu of Quwo attacked and conquered Jin. Duke Wu of Quwo offered gifts to King Xi of Zhou, who in turn made Duke Wu of Quwo the next ruler of Jin and gave him the title of Duke Wu of Jin (晉武公). Quwo finally annexed Jin and changed its name to Jin.

Monarchs of Jin (Chinese state)
8th-century BC Chinese monarchs
7th-century BC Chinese monarchs
678 BC deaths
Year of birth unknown